is a bay in the city of Shima and Toba, Mie Prefecture, Japan.  It is part of the Ise-Shima region.

The bay is known for cultivation of oyster in Japan.

References
 Teikoku's Complete Atlas of Japan, Teikoku-Shoin Co., Ltd., Tokyo 1990, 

Bays of Japan
Landforms of Mie Prefecture